Cuneiform zu, (also sú, ṣú, and Sumerogram ZU (capital letter majuscule)), is an uncommon-use sign in the 1350s BC Amarna letters, the Epic of Gilgamesh, and other cuneiform texts. Alphabetically, it could conceivably be used for letters z, s, ṣ, or u; however in the Amarna letters it is used mostly for personal names or geographical names.

In the Epic of Gilgamesh, Sumerogram ZU is used to spell the name of god Ninazu, (a name of god Tammuz, two times, Chapter XII, 28, 47). In the Epic, ZU is also used as a logogram, ZU.AB, for Akkadian language "apsû", English language "abyss"; it is used twice in Chapter VIII, and twice in Chapter XI, the Gilgamesh flood myth. It was also used to name Giant Squid Studios' game, Abzû.

Uses of zu

Epic of Gilgamesh
The usage numbers for zu in the Epic of Gilgamesh are as follows: sú-(1) time, ṣú-(0), zu-(41), and ZU-(7) times.

Partial list of uses in Amarna letters

EA 100, CitySubaru, (Sú-ba-ru), 
EA 245, Surata, (Sú-ra-ta), -ra- (personal name)
EA 364, CityHazor, (Ha-sú-ra), Ha--ra

References

Moran, William L. 1987, 1992. The Amarna Letters. Johns Hopkins University Press, 1987, 1992. 393 pages.(softcover)
 Parpola, 1971. The Standard Babylonian Epic of Gilgamesh, Parpola, Simo, Neo-Assyrian Text Corpus Project, c 1997, Tablet I through Tablet XII, Index of Names, Sign List, and Glossary-(pp. 119–145), 165 pages.

Cuneiform signs